The 2015 Newcastle City Council Council election took place on 7 May 2015 to elect one third of the members of Newcastle City Council in England. The elections took place on the same day as other local elections.

During the election campaign, hustings were held by JesmondLocal in the North and South Jesmond Wards.

The result saw the majority of governing Labour Party members increase in the council chamber, with winners in seats in the wards Castle and North Jesmond replacing one Liberal Democrat councillor in each for these. Westerhope saw its third independent councillor elected, Pat Hillicks winning the seat with a 1,319 majority over the Labour Party candidate.

In West Gosforth, the Conservative candidate Steve Kyte came close to victory, the last such occasion being 1992, coming 17 votes short. UKIP candidates attracted more support on average than in any previous year, coming second in Byker and in Lemington.

Overall results

Ward results
The electoral division results are listed below:

References

2015 English local elections
May 2015 events in the United Kingdom
2015
21st century in Newcastle upon Tyne